Società Sportiva Calcio Napoli's 2010–11 season was its 68th in Serie A, and fourth consecutive year in the top flight. Napoli will also take part in the 2010–11 UEFA Europa League as a result of finishing 6th in the 2009–10 Serie A table, its highest in Serie A since it also finished 6th in 1993–94.

Season review
Following the end of the World Cup, Napoli bought Edinson Cavani from fellow Southern club Palermo. He cost roughly €17 million for Napoli, and was the clubs' most expensive player ever bought. The club also loaned out playmaker Luca Cigarini to Sevilla, despite having the medical postponed due to illness.

Players

Squad information

Transfers

In

1.Napoli will pay a fee of €17 million to purchase Cavani outright when loan expires.

Out

Loan out

2.Chievo has an option to purchase Bogliacino outright when deal expires.
3.Juventus paid €4.5 million for the loan, and is expected to purchase Quagliarella outright when deal expires.
4.Juventus paid €600,000 for the loan, and has an option to purchase Rinaudo outright for €5 million when loan expires.

Competitions

Serie A

League table

Results summary

Results by round

Matches

Coppa Italia

Napoli qualified into the Round of 16 in the 2010–11 Coppa Italia by finishing sixth in the previous year's table, marking the first time since 1994–95 Napoli have entered the tournament at that stage. Napoli aim for its fourth victory in the national competition, and first since its 1986–87 finals win against Atalanta.

UEFA Europa League

Napoli qualified to the play-off round of the 2010–11 UEFA Europa League by finishing 6th in Serie A in 2009–10. This marks Napoli's first appearance in the competition since the 1994–95 UEFA Cup, under its previous name, and 13th overall. Napoli aim to add to its only triumph in the competition: its 1988–89 UEFA Cup victory over VfB Stuttgart.

Play-off round

Napoli were drawn against Swedish side IF Elfsborg of the Allsvenskan, who advanced through defeats of FC Iskra-Stal and FK Teteks in the previous qualifying rounds. Hosting the first leg at the Stadio San Paolo, Napoli survived on a clear-path goal by Ezequiel Lavezzi in first half stoppage time, taking a 1-0 lead to Sweden.

Edinson Cavani, kept off the scoresheet in his debut with Napoli, hoped for better fortunes in the return leg of the matchup. Indeed, he scored his first two goals as a member of the club to help go up 3–0 on aggregate through halftime in Sweden. Napoli would go on to win by that score, and advance to the group stage.

Group stage

Knockout phase

Round of 32

Statistics

Appearances and goals

|-
! colspan="14" style="background:#dcdcdc; text-align:center"| Goalkeepers

|-
! colspan="14" style="background:#dcdcdc; text-align:center"| Defenders

|-
! colspan="14" style="background:#dcdcdc; text-align:center"| Midfielders

|-
! colspan="14" style="background:#dcdcdc; text-align:center"| Forwards

|-
! colspan="14" style="background:#dcdcdc; text-align:center"| Players transferred out during the season

Goalscorers

Last updated: 6 January 2016

References

S.S.C. Napoli seasons
Napoli
Napoli